The Upper Atbara and Setit Dam Complex is a twin dam complex comprising Rumela Dam on the Upper Atbarah River and Burdana Dam on the Setit (Tekezé) River in eastern Sudan. Construction began in 2011 was expected to be completed by March 2016. The 320 MW dam was inaugurated by President Omar al-Bashir in February 2017, with final stages completed later that year.

Design

Project objectives
The project was announced in April 2010 with the aims of supporting the development of eastern Sudan by providing irrigation for local agriculture, supplying potable water, and power generation.
Additionally, the dams are expected to provide flood-protection measures along the river banks by regulating the river flow in the project area.

Project costs
The total cost of the dam complex is estimated at $1.9 billion, of which $838 million for the construction of the dams is from the China Three Gorges Corporation (CTG) and its overseas project-contracting subsidiary, China International Water & Electric Corporation (CWE).

In addition to the project implementation costs are hydroelectric and electric costs, technical and consultancy service costs, land-owning and population resettlement costs, and project implementation management and supervision costs by Sudan's Dams Implementation Unit (DIU). The consultant for the project is the French company Sogreah, which also designed and supervised the implementation of the Khashm el-Girba Dam during the 1960s. The Rumela and Burdana dam designs were revised by the German Company Lahmeyer International, the same company that allegedly revised and supervised the design of the controversial Merowe Dam.

Archaeology
Archaeological surveys were undertaken in the area to be flooded by the National Corporation for Antiquities and Museums during the summer of 2011.

References

External links 

 Profile at Preserve the Middle Nile Blog
  Sudan: German company Lahmeyer commissions Atbara dam As of 25 August 2018.

Dams in Sudan
Dams in the Nile basin
Hydroelectric power stations in Sudan
Energy infrastructure completed in 2017
Renewable energy power stations in Sudan
2017 establishments in Sudan
Atbarah River